The Mars Diaries is a science fiction series for young adults by the best-selling author, Sigmund Brouwer, published by Tyndale House Publishers in 2000 - 2002.  Set in an experimental community on Mars in the year 2039, the Mars Diaries feature fourteen-year-old virtual reality specialist Tyce Sanders.  It was re-published by Tyndale House Publishers in 2009 and 2012 as a 5 volume series titled Robot Wars.

Characters

Tyce Sanders:  The first person ever born on Mars, Tyce's legs are paralyzed because of an experimental surgery when he was one Earth year old, the same surgery that allows him to control a robot directly through his nervous system.

Ashley:  Another teenager with robot-control abilities, Ashley is Tyce's best friend his own age.  She comes to Mars with Dr. Jordan, but she turns against him in Mission Four.

Rawling McTigre: The director of the Mars Project and Tyce's only friend for the fourteen years before Ashley arrived, Rawling is in his mid-forties and came to Mars as a medical doctor.

Kristy Sanders: Tyce's mom and  a scientist that works in a laboratory and works with plants and to help them grow on the planet.

Chase Sanders: Tyce's dad and a  pilot that pilots spaceships to and from Mars and Earth.

Blaine Steven: The director of the dome in book one. He is fired at the end of book one when he tries to kill everyone inside of it.

Dr. Jordan: Terrataker introduced in Mission Three who holds kids with robot control abilities and forces them to do his will.

Luke Daab: Maintenance engineer who is revealed as a Terrataker in Mission Six. After helping Dr. Jordan to escape he later continues to terrorize in Mission Ten

Mission 1: Oxygen Level Zero

The science station is in trouble. Oxygen is leaking out of the dome, and the scientists and tekkies are stumped. The next supply ship from Earth isn't due for days. Tyce holds the key to the mystery. But will he discover it in time to save those who live under the dome?

Mission 2: Alien Pursuit

A high-level tekkie is found unconscious in the plant lab. Worse, it looks like teeth and claws have ripped his space suit! It's clear someone-or something- chased him. But who or what? And why? Tyce does not believe aliens exist, but his discoveries may force him to rethink this view.

Mission 3: Time Bomb

A quake triggers the appearance of strange black boxes on the Martian landscape. So director Rawling asks Tyce and his father to journey with him across the Martian plain. As Tyce approaches a box, he makes a startling discovery- one that could change life for everyone in the universe. That is, if Tyce lives to uncover the truth.

Mission 4:  Hammerhead

The Earth scientists call it a killer comet. Headed toward Mars, it threatens to destroy the dome and all who live in it. Their only chance is Tyce Sanders, who must learn to pilot a test space vehicle in only a matter of weeks. As the crisis worsens, Tyce discovers the comet is the least of the problems on Mars. And that the secrets and betrayals will test the strength of his new faith...

Mission 5:  Sole Survivor

Director Rawling and three other scientists are trapped by a cave-in. Just as Tyce Sanders starts a rescue mission, rebels take over the science station. They threaten to kill their hostages, one at a time, until their demands are met-and time's running out. If Tyce can't stop the rebels soon, the trapped scientists will run out of air. And everyone under the dome will die.

Mission 6:  Moon Racer

A devious plot threatens to overtake the spaceship Moon Racer as Tyce, Ashley, and the crew near the end of their six-month journey from Mars to Earth. Who's the rebel mastermind?. Could it be one of the six other people on board?. In a race against time Tyce must find out or the Moon Racer and everyone aboard is doomed to crash into the sun!

Mission 7:  Countdown

A Military Prison in the wild Florida Everglades holds Tyce, his dad, and Ashley hostage. With only six days left to rescue the kids at the secret Institute, they must find a way out. But who can they trust with Terrataker infiltrators everywhere?. And how will they get back in time to save Tyce's dad?

Mission 8:  Robot War

A Secret Institute holds 23 kids prisoner, an evil part of the Terrataker's plot to take over the world. Their first target is the Governors' Summit in New York, only two days away. Tyce and Ashley must find a way to save the governors and the world from war!

Mission 9:  Manchurian Sector

When a nuclear reactor threatens to blow, Tyce must reveal his special talents to the world—that he can control a robot through virtual reality. Now he's in danger. The Terrataker rebels had hoped to keep this technology a secret, and Tyce is threatening their plans. As they get desperate, time begins to run out... for Tyce, his father, and the others Tyce had hoped to save.

Mission 10:  Last stand

A Manchurian fleet threatens to overtake the entire planet as soon as Tyce and Ashley arrive back on Mars. Contact with Earth has been lost—the dome is virtually defenseless. Someone must be aiding the enemy from inside the dome—but who? Tyce and Ashley must find out—before the approaching fleet arrives...and wins.

References

Canadian science fiction novels